The Wooden Shoe Tulip Festival is a Tulip festival held in Woodburn, Oregon, United States.

History
Established in 1985, the 35th annual event was held in 2019.

The 2020 festival was cancelled due to the coronavirus pandemic and a statewide restriction on large events. The 9,000 pots of flowers prepared for the festival were donated to local assisted living care centers through online donations.

References

External links

  (April 20, 2018), The Oregonian

1985 establishments in Oregon
Annual events in Oregon
Festivals in Oregon
Flower festivals in the United States
Woodburn, Oregon